Marboué is a commune in the Eure-et-Loir department in northern France.

In June 1944, French resident of American citizenship, Virginia Roush, married to d'Albert Lake, was arrested near the village, she may have been tortured but never betrayed her fellow fighters.

Population

See also
Communes of the Eure-et-Loir department

References

Communes of Eure-et-Loir